An onward ticket is a proof of a booked train, bus or airline ticket originating from the country about to be entered.

An onward ticket reflects any of these:
 a round-trip airline ticket
 an airline or train or bus ticket from one country to another 
 a one-way airline ticket to a country with an onward ticket requirement as a stop-over

When required
An onward ticket can be required, based on the countries' entry requirements (which may or may not include the onward ticket). Many countries insist a flight ticket be held out from their country, which must be presented upon arrival at immigration. They set this requirement, so that if travellers run out of money, the country is certain that the traveller can depart. In the past, travellers would remain in a country supporting themselves by illicit employment. Without an onward ticket, a traveller may be refused entry to these countries and subsequently placed on the next plane for the destination from where he arrived. 

However, there are also many states that do not operate this policy and are less strict in the application of the law of the countries' customs. To determine which do and do not, guide books, websites of the own Ministry of Foreign Affairs or the relevant embassies and/or other sources may be used.

See also
 Passport
 Visa (document)
 Immigration law

Notes and references

Immigration law
International travel documents
Airline tickets